Ronald Henry Blackman (2 April 1925 – 16 February 2016), known as Ronnie or Ron Blackman, was an English professional footballer.

Blackman played a vital role in the Reading team that finished second in the 1951–52 Third Division, narrowly missing out on promotion. Towards the end of that season, within the space of three weeks, Blackman scored a total of 10 goals at Elm Park – including five goals against Southend United on 14 April and four against Bournemouth on 3 May to end the season on a high note. He scored 39 league goals that season and another goal in the FA Cup, a league club record which has yet to be equalled six decades later, although Trevor Senior edged ahead by scoring 41 goals in all competitions in 1983–84.

Blackman died on 16 February 2016. A minute's applause was held in his honour before Reading's FA Cup tie with West Bromwich Albion on 19 February 2016.

References

External links

1925 births
2016 deaths
Footballers from Portsmouth
Association football forwards
English footballers
Gosport Borough F.C. players
Reading F.C. players
Nottingham Forest F.C. players
Ipswich Town F.C. players
Tonbridge Angels F.C. players
English Football League players